The Harrisburg–York–Lebanon, PA Combined Statistical Area (CSA) is a region assigned by the U.S. Office of Management Budget that includes six cities in the Harrisburg and York areas along with several Metropolitan statistical areas of Pennsylvania that combine to form a Combined statistical area. As of the 2010 United States census, the CSA had a population total of 2,219,422, and ranked the third most populous CSA in Pennsylvania and 43rd most populous in the nation.

Components of the Combined Statistical Area
Harrisburg–Carlisle, PA Metropolitan Statistical Area
Cumberland County population 235,406
Dauphin County population 268,100
Perry County population 45,969
Lebanon, PA Metropolitan Statistical Area
Lebanon County population 133,568
Gettysburg, PA Metropolitan Statistical Area
Adams County population 101,407
York–Hanover, PA Metropolitan Statistical Area
York County population 434,972

Demographics 
As of 2000 census, there were 629,401 people, 248,931 households, and 167,328 families residing in the CSA. The racial makeup of the CSA was 87.78% White, 7.84% African American, 0.14% Native American, 1.53% Asian, 0.03% Pacific Islander, 1.38% from other races, and 1.29% from two or more races. Hispanic or Latino of any race were 3.11% of the population. The median income for a household in the CSA was $42,740, and the median income for a family was $51,071. Males had a median income of $35,660 versus $26,116 for females. The per capita income for the CSA was $21,017.

See also
List of Combined Statistical Areas
List of Metropolitan Statistical Areas
Pennsylvania metropolitan areas

References

Combined statistical areas of the United States